Monterey is an unincorporated community in Clermont County, in the U.S. state of Ohio.

History
A post office called Monterey was established in 1847, and was discontinued in 1957. The community was named in commemoration of the Battle of Monterey (1846).

References

Unincorporated communities in Clermont County, Ohio
Unincorporated communities in Ohio